The 1966–67 Football League Cup was the seventh season of the Football League Cup, a knockout competition for England's top 92 football clubs. The competition started on 23 August 1966 and ended with the final on 4 March 1967. This was the first season during which Arsenal, Tottenham Hotspur, and Wolverhampton participated in the League Cup; Everton and Liverpool were the only League teams that did not compete. 

The final was contested by Third Division side Queens Park Rangers and First Division side West Bromwich Albion at Wembley Stadium in London; this was the first League Cup final to take place at a neutral venue, instead of as a two-legged tie. Clive Clark scored twice in the first half to give West Bromwich Albion a 2–0 half-time lead. However, second-half goals from Queens Park Rangers' Roger Morgan, Rodney Marsh, and Mark Lazarus turned the game around. Queens Park Rangers, who also won the Third Division championship this season, eventually won the match 3–2 to claim the trophy.

Match dates and results were initially drawn from Soccerbase, and they were later checked against Rothmans Football Yearbook 1970–71.

Calendar
Of the 90 teams, 38 received a bye to the second round (teams ranked 1st–40th in the 1965–66 Football League, excluding 2 teams that did not compete) and the other 52 played in the first round. Semi-finals were two-legged.

First round

Ties

Replays

Second round

Ties

Replays

2nd replay

Third round

Ties

Replays

Fourth round

Ties

Replays

Fifth round

Ties

Semi-finals

First leg

Second leg

Final

The final was held at Wembley Stadium, London on 4 March 1967.

MATCH RULES
90 minutes.
30 minutes of extra-time if necessary.
Replay if scores still level.
One named substitute.

References

General

Specific

									
									
									

1966–67
1966–67 domestic association football cups
Cup